The Second European Political Community Summit is a planned meeting of the European Political Community to be held on 1 June 2023 at Mimi Castle, Bulboaca 35 km from Chișinău, Moldova. It is expected to be attended forty-seven heads of states, governments, and European Union institutions.

Aims
The focus of discussions for the summit are expected to include securing key infrastructure such as pipelines, cables, and satellites; stepping up the fight against cyberattacks, creating a support fund for Ukraine, working out a common, pan-European energy policy and looking into the possibility of having more university and student exchanges. 

In the official statement announcing the date of the summit, Moldovan President Maia Sandu stated that the discussions will include "joint efforts for peace, in the context of the war in Ukraine and related crises, the defense of democracy, the strengthening of energy security and the resilience of European states".

Following a bilateral summit meeting between the leaders of the United Kingdom and France on 10 March 2023, it was stated in the joint declaration that the EPC should focus on energy, infrastructures, connectivity, cybersecurity, countering disinformation and migration.

Preparation

A brainstorming session on the future shape of the European Political Community was held by Moldovan foreign minister Nicu Popescu in Paris on 22 November 2022. Preparations and agendas for the summit were further discussed at a meeting of OSCE foreign ministers in Łódź, Poland in December 2022. On 12 January 2023, it was announced by Moldovan President Maia Sandu, that the summit would be held on 1 June 2023. On 21 January 2023, it was confirmed that San Marino has joined the European Political Community and will be attending the summit. A preparatory meeting for the summit, involving officials from the participating states, was held on 26 January 2022 at the headquarters of the European Council in Brussels. On 3 February 2023, Popescu announced that the venue for the summit had been decided upon and would be made public in due course. Popescu discussed arrangements and preparations for the summit on the fringes of a meeting of the EU Foreign Affairs Council on 20 February 2023. On 2 March 2023, it was announced that the summit would take place at Mimi Castle, a private winery 35km from Chișinău. It has been reported that the heads of government of Andorra and Monaco will also attend this summit.

Participants
The summit is expected to be attended by the heads of state or government of the states participating in the European Political Community along with the President of the European Council and President of the European Commission. Forty-seven heads of states, governments, and European Union institutions have been invited to attend.

Outcomes

Kosovo-Moldova relations
Host nation Moldova has not recognized the independence of Kosovo and usually refuses admission to holders of Kosovar passports which could lead to issues with delegates from Kosovo attending the summit. However, in the lead up to the summit, legislation has been progressed in the Moldovan parliament that if enacted will recognize Kosovar passports as valid travel documents allowing holders to apply for electronic visas to enter Moldova.

See also

 European integration
 Pan-European identity
 Politics of Europe

References

External links
Mimi Castle

European Political Community
Diplomatic conferences
2023 conferences
Foreign relations of the European Union
European integration
European Political Community
Pan-European organizations
2023 in Moldova
History of Chișinău
21st-century diplomatic conferences (Europe)
2023 in international relations